Luís Carlos Quintanilha (born 17 March 1965), commonly known as Luisinho, is a retired Brazilian footballer who spent most of his career with Botafogo and Vasco da Gama.

International career
Luisinho represented Brazil at the 1993 Copa América, scoring in the penalty shoot-out loss to Argentina. He scored his only goal for his nation at the 1993 U.S. Cup, in a 3–3 draw with Germany.

Career statistics

International

International goals
Scores and results list Brazil's goal tally first.

References

External links
 
 

1965 births
Living people
Brazilian footballers
Brazilian expatriate footballers
Brazil international footballers
Association football midfielders
Botafogo de Futebol e Regatas players
CR Vasco da Gama players
Sport Club Corinthians Paulista players
RC Celta de Vigo players
Brazilian expatriate sportspeople in Spain
Expatriate footballers in Spain
Footballers from Rio de Janeiro (city)